is an airport serving Aguni, a village in the Shimajiri District of the Okinawa Prefecture of Japan. The prefecture operates the airport, which is classified as a third class airport.

References

External links
 Aguni Airport
 Aguni Airport Guide from Japan Airlines
 

Airports in Okinawa